The Income Tax (Trading and Other Income) Act 2005 (c 5) is an Act of the Parliament of the United Kingdom.

It restated certain legislation relating to income tax, with minor changes that were mainly intended "to clarify existing provisions, make them consistent or bring the law into line with well established practice." The Bill was the work of the Tax Law Rewrite Project team at the  Inland Revenue.

Part 1

Section 1
Section 1(2) was repealed by Part 1 of Schedule 3 to the Income Tax Act 2007.

Part 2

Chapter 4

Section 51
This section was repealed by Part 1 of Schedule 3 to the Income Tax Act 2007.

Section 75
Section 75(5) was repealed by paragraph 42 of the Schedule to the Finance Act 2009, Schedule 47 (Consequential Amendments) Order 2009 (SI 2009/2035).

Section 79
Section 79(2) was repealed by Part 1 of Schedule 3 to the Corporation Tax Act 2009.

Chapter 5

Section 88
Section 88(4)(a) was repealed by section 70 of, and Part 2(2) of Schedule 11 to, the Finance （No. 2） Act 2005.

Chapter 7

Section 108
Sections 108(4)(c) and (d) were repealed by Part 1 of Schedule 3 to the Income Tax Act 2007.

Chapter 8

Section 128
This section was repealed by paragraph 43 of the Schedule to the Finance Act 2009, Schedule 47 (Consequential Amendments) Order 2009.

Chapter 9

Section 130
Sections 130(1)(b) and (6) were repealed by section 178(1) of, and Part 3(4) of Schedule 26 to, the Finance Act 2006.

Section 131
This section was repealed by section 178(1) of, and Part 3(4) of Schedule 26 to, the Finance Act 2006.

Section 132
Sections 132(1)(a) and (2) and (3) were repealed by section 178(1) of, and Part 3(4) of Schedule 26 to, the Finance Act 2006.

Section 134
Section 134(4) was repealed by section 178(1) of, and Part 3(4) of Schedule 26 to, the Finance Act 2006.

Section 135
Section 135(1)(d), (6)(b) to (d) and (7) were repealed by section 178(1) of, and Part 3(4) of Schedule 26 to, the Finance Act 2006.

Sections 136 to 144
These sections was repealed by section 178(1) of, and Part 3(4) of Schedule 26 to, the Finance Act 2006.

Chapter 11

Section 157
This section was repealed by paragraph 43(1)(a) of Schedule 39 to the Finance Act 2012.

Section 160
This section was repealed by paragraph 51 of Schedule 4 to the Finance Act 2013.

Section 162
This section was repealed by paragraph 21(1)(a) of Schedule 39 to the Finance Act 2012.

Chapter 12

Section 186
Sections 186(2) to (4) were repealed by paragraph 439(4) of the Transfer of Tribunal Functions and Revenue and Customs Appeals Order 2009 (SI 2009/56).

Chapter 16

Section 223
Section 223(4) was repealed by section 25(5)(c) of the Finance Act 2016.

Chapter 16A

Section 225N
Sections 225N(3) and (4) were repealed by paragraph 6(2) of Schedule 31 to the Finance Act 2013. Section 225N(5) was repealed by paragraph 14(2) of Schedule 31 to the Finance Act 2013.

Section 225O
This section was repealed by paragraph 6(3) of Schedule 31 to the Finance Act 2013.

Sections 225P and 225Q
These sections were repealed by paragraph 15 of Schedule 31 to the Finance Act 2013.

Section 225T
This section was repealed by paragraph 9 of Schedule 31 to the Finance Act 2013.

Chapter 17

Sections 238 and 239
This section was repealed by paragraph 51 of Schedule 4 to the Finance Act 2013.

Chapter 17A

Section 240D
Section 240D(6) was repealed by paragraph 9(6) of Schedule 2 to the Finance (No. 2) Act 2017.

Part 3

Chapter 1

Section 260
Section 260(1)(f) was repealed by paragraph 47(b) of Schedule 7 to the Finance Act 2008.

Chapter 3

Section 269
Sections 269(3) and (4) were repealed by paragraph 48 of Schedule 7 to the Finance Act 2008.

Section 272
Section 272(1) was repealed by paragraph 16(3) of Schedule 2 to the Finance (No. 2) Act 2017.

Chapter 4

Section 302B
Sections 302B(3) and (4) were repealed by paragraph 57(2) of Schedule 23 to the Finance Act 2011.

Section 305
This section was repealed by paragraph 44 of the Schedule to the Finance Act 2009, Schedule 47 (Consequential Amendments) Order 2009.

Chapter 5

Sections 308A to 308C
These sections were repealed by section 74(1)(a) of the Finance Act 2016.

Section 319
This section was repealed by paragraph 43(1)(b) of Schedule 39 to the Finance Act 2012.

Chapter 6

Section 322
Sections 322(2)(b) and (c) were repealed by Part 1 of Schedule 3 to the Income Tax Act 2007.

Section 327
Section 327(2)(c) was repealed by section 74(1)(b) of the Finance Act 2016.

Chapter 8

Section 339
Section 339(3) was repealed by paragraph 43(2)(a)(ii) of Schedule 39 to the Finance Act 2012.

Sections 340 to 343
These sections were repealed by paragraph 43(1)(c) of Schedule 39 to the Finance Act 2012.

Chapter 11 - Overseas property income
This Chapter consisted of sections 357 to 360. This Chapter was repealed by paragraph 49 of Schedule 7 to the Finance Act 2008.

Chapter 12

Section 362
This section was repealed by paragraph 8 of Schedule 5 to the Finance Act 2019.

Part 4

Chapter 1

Section 365
Section 365(1)(i) was repealed by regulation 36(2) of the Unauthorised Unit Trusts (Tax) Regulations 2013 (SI 2013/2819). Section 365(1)(k) was repealed by paragraph 2(b) of Schedule 12 to the Finance Act 2013.

Chapter 2

Section 373
Sections 373(4) and (6) were repealed by section 70 of, and Part 2(3) of Schedule 11 to, the Finance (No. 2) Act 2005.

Section 376
Section 376(4) and (6) were repealed by section 70 of, and Part 2(3) of Schedule 11 to, the Finance (No. 2) Act 2005.

Chapter 3

Section 384
Section 384(3) was repealed by paragraph 5 of Schedule 1 to the Finance Act 2016.

Section 385A
This section was repealed by section 14(1) of the Finance Act 2017.

Section 393
Section 393(5) was repealed by paragraph 6 of Schedule 1 to the Finance Act 2016.

Section 394
Section 394(5) was repealed by paragraph 7(a) of Schedule 1 to the Finance Act 2016.

Section 397
This section was repealed by paragraph 1(1) of Schedule 1 to the Finance Act 2016. Section 397(2)(b) was repealed by Part 1 of Schedule 3 to the Income Tax Act 2007.

Sections 397A
Sections 397 to 398 were repealed by paragraph 1(1) of Schedule 1 to the Finance Act 2016. Section 397A(8) was repealed by paragraph 14(b) of Schedule 29 to the Finance Act 2013.

Section 397AA
Sections 397 to 398 were repealed by paragraph 1(1) of Schedule 1 to the Finance Act 2016.

Section 397B
This section was repealed by paragraph 15 of Schedule 29 to the Finance Act 2013.

Sections 397BA and 397C
Sections 397 to 398 were repealed by paragraph 1(1) of Schedule 1 to the Finance Act 2016.

Section 398
This section was repealed by paragraph 1(1) of Schedule 1 to the Finance Act 2016.

Section 399
Sections 399(3) to (5), (5A) and (7) were repealed by paragraphs 11(4) to (6) of Schedule 1 to the Finance Act 2016.

Section 400
This section was repealed by paragraph 1(1) of Schedule 1 to the Finance Act 2016. Section 400(7) was repealed by regulation 36(6) of the Unauthorised Unit Trusts (Tax) Regulations 2013.

Section 401A
This section was repealed by paragraph 13 of Schedule 1 to the Finance Act 2016.

Chapter 4

Section 406
Section 406(4A) was repealed by paragraph 15 of Schedule 1 to the Finance Act 2016.

Section 407
Section 407(4A) was repealed by paragraph 15 of Schedule 1 to the Finance Act 2016.

Chapter 5

Section 414
This section was repealed by paragraph 1(1) of Schedule 1 to the Finance Act 2016.

Chapter 6

Section 416
Section 416(2) was repealed by paragraph 18(b) of Schedule 1 to the Finance Act 2016.

Section 421
This section was repealed by paragraph 1(1) of Schedule 1 to the Finance Act 2016.

Chapter 8

Section 457
Section 457(3) was repealed by Part 1 of Schedule 3 to the Income Tax Act 2007. Section 457(4) was repealed by section 178(1) of, and Part 3(15) of Schedule 26 to, the Finance Act 2006.

Chapter 10 - Distributions from unauthorised unit trusts
This Chapter was repealed by regulation 36(8) of the Unauthorised Unit Trusts (Tax) Regulations 2013.

Chapter 12

Section 568
Section 568(5) was repealed by section 178(1) of, and Part 3(15) of Schedule 26 to, the Finance Act 2006.

Part 5

Chapter 5

Section 647
This section repealed by paragraph 57(3) of Schedule 23 to the Finance Act 2011.

Chapter 7

Section 683
Section 683(4)(g) was repealed by paragraph 21(2) of Schedule 39 to the Finance Act 2012.

Section 685A
Section 685A(4)(c) was repealed by Part 1 of Schedule 3 to the Income Tax Act 2007.

Part 6

Chapter 7

Section 724
Section 724(3) was repealed by Part 1 of Schedule 3 to the Income Tax Act 2007.

Chapter 8

Section 748
This section was repealed by paragraph 21(1)(b) of Schedule 39 to the Finance Act 2012.

Part 8

Chapter 1

Section 830
Section 830(2)(d) repealed by paragraph 51(3) of Schedule 7 to the Finance Act 2008.

Chapter 2

Section 831
This section repealed by paragraph 52 of Schedule 7 to the Finance Act 2008.

Sections 833 to 837
These sections were repealed by paragraph 54 of Schedule 7 to the Finance Act 2008.

Part 9

Section 858
Section 858(3) was repealed by paragraph 27 of Schedule 1 to the Finance Act 2016.

Section 862
Sections 862(3) and (7) were repealed by Part 1 of Schedule 3 to the Corporation Tax Act 2009.

Part 10

Chapter 3

Sections 876 and 877
These sections were repealed by Part 1 of Schedule 3 to the Income Tax Act 2007.

Section 879
Section 879(2) was repealed by Part 1 of Schedule 3 to the Income Tax Act 2007.

Section 881
This section was repealed by Part 1 of Schedule 3 to the Corporation Tax Act 2009.

References
"Income Tax (Trading and Other Income) Act 2005". Halsbury's Statutes of England and Wales. Fourth Edition. 2010 Reissue. Title "Taxes, Customs and Excise". Volume 46.

External links
The Income Tax (Trading and Other Income) Act 2005, as amended from the National Archives.
The Income Tax (Trading and Other Income) Act 2005, as originally enacted from the National Archives.
Explanatory notes to the Income Tax (Trading and Other Income) Act 2005.

United Kingdom Acts of Parliament 2005
Tax legislation in the United Kingdom
Income tax in the United Kingdom